George Cheyne may refer to:

 George Cheyne (physician) (1671–1743), British physician and medical writer
 George Cheyne (settler) (1790–1869), early settler in Western Australia